The 2022 Lima Challenger II was a professional tennis tournament played on clay courts. It was the 18th edition of the tournament which was part of the 2022 ATP Challenger Tour. It took place in Lima, Peru between 24 and 30 October 2022.

Singles main-draw entrants

Seeds

 1 Rankings are as of 17 October 2022.

Other entrants
The following players received wildcards into the singles main draw:
  Nicolás Álvarez
  Gonzalo Bueno
  Ignacio Buse

The following player received entry into the singles main draw as a special exempt:
  João Lucas Reis da Silva

The following player received entry into the singles main draw as an alternate:
  Thiago Agustín Tirante

The following players received entry from the qualifying draw:
  Jan Choinski
  Max Houkes
  Nikola Milojević
  Giovanni Mpetshi Perricard
  Genaro Alberto Olivieri
  Thiago Seyboth Wild

The following players received entry as lucky losers:
  Román Andrés Burruchaga
  Mariano Navone
  Miljan Zekić

Champions

Singles

  Daniel Altmaier def.  Tomás Martín Etcheverry 6–1, 6–7(4–7), 6–4.

Doubles

  Jesper de Jong /  Max Houkes def.  Guido Andreozzi /  Guillermo Durán 7–6(8–6), 3–6, [12–10].

References

2022 ATP Challenger Tour
2022
October 2022 sports events in South America
2022 in Peruvian sport